

507001–507100 

|-bgcolor=#f2f2f2
| colspan=4 align=center | 
|}

507101–507200 

|-bgcolor=#f2f2f2
| colspan=4 align=center | 
|}

507201–507300 

|-bgcolor=#f2f2f2
| colspan=4 align=center | 
|}

507301–507400 

|-bgcolor=#f2f2f2
| colspan=4 align=center | 
|}

507401–507500 

|-id=490
| 507490 Possum ||  || The Possum Observatory  near Gisborne, New Zealand. It regularly conducts and submits CBAT astrometric observations of comets, asteroids and NEOs. In addition, Possum Observatory has helped detect exoplanets using microlensing. The observatory is named after the owner, John Drummond's late wife, Elizabeth `Possum' Drummond. || 
|}

507501–507600 

|-bgcolor=#f2f2f2
| colspan=4 align=center | 
|}

507601–507700 

|-bgcolor=#f2f2f2
| colspan=4 align=center | 
|}

507701–507800 

|-bgcolor=#f2f2f2
| colspan=4 align=center | 
|}

507801–507900 

|-bgcolor=#f2f2f2
| colspan=4 align=center | 
|}

507901–508000 

|-bgcolor=#f2f2f2
| colspan=4 align=center | 
|}

References 

507001-508000